Emmanuelle 3: A Lesson in Love is a 1994 softcore television movie, which was directed by David Cove, and produced by Alain Siritzky, based on character by Emmanuelle Arsan.  It was the third episode from the Emmanuelle in Space series.

Fresh from Haffron and Theo's sexual experiences, Emmanuelle takes Tasha, a female member of the space crew to exotic locations to learn all about the basic and tantric of pansexuality.  Tasha has many sexual experiences, among them are a voyeuristic encounter with a hotel manager and a random act of meaningless sex on a boat.

Cast
 Krista Allen as Emmanuelle
 Paul Michael Robinson as Captain Haffron Williams
 Kimberly Rowe as Angie
 Tiendra Demian as Tasha
 Robert Nassry as Dimitri
 SPC Derek Krueger as Derek, The Boss With The Sauce

References

External links
 
 
 "Emmanuelle 3: A Lesson in Love" review

American television films
1994 television films
1994 films
Emmanuelle in Space
1990s French films